Saint-Vincent-de-Pertignas is a commune in the Gironde department in Nouvelle-Aquitaine in southwestern France.

Population

Geography

The commune contains a number of farms, vineyards, homes and a medieval church (pictured). It is a short walk to Rauzan, the next commune over, to the south. The ruins of the castle in Rauzan are visible from Saint-Vincent-de-Pertignas. The nearest train station from Saint-Vincent-de-Pertignas is located in Libourne. Saint-Vincent-de-Pertignas is bounded to the north by Dordogne and the Gamage river.

History

A cemetery that dates to the Merovingian dynasty was discovered in the commune's heart in 1986, showing that Saint-Vincent-de-Pertignas has been inhabited for a great length of time.

See also
Communes of the Gironde department

References

Communes of Gironde